A Christmas Carol: A Ghost Story is a 2021 stage version of the 1843 novella A Christmas Carol by Charles Dickens. Adapted by Mark Gatiss and directed by Adam Penford, the stage drama was originally scheduled to open in 2020 but was delayed owing to the COVID-19 pandemic. It was eventually produced at the Nottingham Playhouse from 29 October to 20 November 2021 with a cast of 15 playing 50 characters and was filmed live for a cinema release during the stage run at the Alexandra Palace in London where it ran from 26 November 2021 to 9 January 2022. It received its cinema release on the 27th November and 1st December 2022 before it was shown on BBC Four on 25 December 2022.

Synopsis
On Christmas Eve, seven years after the death of his partner Jacob Marley (Mark Gatiss), the solitary miser Ebenezer Scrooge (Nicholas Farrell) receives a visit from the ghost of his former partner. Fettered in heavy chains as a consequence for a lifetime of greed, Marley tells Scrooge that it isn’t too late for Scrooge to save himself from the same fate by changing his ways. To do so, however, he must first face three more ghosts.

Cast

Mark Gatiss as Jacob Marley/Old Joe/Ghost of Christmas Yet to Come
Nicholas Farrell as Ebenezer Scrooge
James Backway as Fred/Young Scrooge 
Jo Eaton-Kent as the Ghost of Christmas Past 
Joe Shire as the Ghost of Christmas Present/Fezziwig
Zak Ford-Williams as Tiny Tim
Aoife Gaston as Belle
Angelina Chudi as Caroline
Christopher Godwin as the Narrator/Tim
Edward Harrison as Bob Cratchit
Sarah Ridgeway as Mrs Cratchit
Renae Rhodes as child
Lauren Tanner as child
Esme Tchoudi as child
Charlie Westlake as child

Production

The drama was directed by Nottingham Playhouse's artistic director Adam Penford, while the production was designed by Paul Wills with a lighting design by Philip Gladwell, sound design by Ella Wahlström, video design by Nina Dunn, movement direction by Georgina Lamb and composition by Tingying Dong.

Giving the stage show three stars out of five, Arifa Akbar, the critic for The Guardian wrote,
Gatiss's script is surprisingly faithful, given his flair for imaginative reworks of canonical stories (from Dracula to Sherlock), and some dialogue is unchanged along with the words of the narrator (Christopher Godwin). This reminds us of the inherent theatricality in Dickens's storytelling, heightened with the use of puppets and some bewitching surprises such as a delightful cloud of ghosts that suddenly emerge and swing around the auditorium...

Some key moments feel too fleeting and don't carry enough emotion, including Tiny Tim's deathbed scene. But when the human drama slows down, it gains an emotional catch, such as a romantic pause between Belle (Aoife Gaston) and the young Scrooge, and the final scene between Scrooge and Bob Cratchit (Edward Harrison); we wish for a few more of these.

The end brings a clever twist and a great surge in festive feeling, with carol singing and general good cheer.

Mark Brown of The Daily Telegraph was rather more generous, giving the production five stars out of five. He wrote,
"While the production (sub-headed 'A Ghost Story') is utterly, and fabulously, theatrical, Gatiss has, as if in reverence to Dickens's original stage prose presentations, inserted a narrator (played as an all-knowing Cockney by Christopher Godwin). This storyteller enables Gatiss – who also plays the ill-fated ghost of Scrooge's former business partner Jacob Marley – to both dramatise the dialogue of the novella, whilst giving expression to some of the finest passages of Dickens’s prose... 

The story that then unfolds is told by a fine cast of no fewer than 15 actors. The improbably versatile set is transformed into the various locations of Scrooge's nocturnal and spiritual journeys with the assistance of top-class video projections and superb stage illusions... ethereal ghosts fly over the heads of the audience by means of the simplest of puppet-making techniques. On the other, some very smart video work gives a spectacular visual dimension to the arrival of Marley's chain-clanking apparition.

See also
 Adaptations of A Christmas Carol

References 

2021 plays
A Christmas Carol
Plays based on A Christmas Carol
British plays
Plays set in London
Christmas plays